Newk's Eatery is an American chain of fast casual cafés which operates over 100 restaurants in 13 states.

Corporate history

Newk's Eatery was founded in 2004 as Newk's Express Café by father and son chefs, Don and Chris Newcomb, with the first store opening in Oxford, Mississippi. Newcomb and Newcomb had previously created and sold the restaurant chain McAlister's Deli.

In 2013, the company rebranded itself as Newk's Eatery. In addition to the updated name, the company introduced a fresh design to its logo.

The business was bought by private equity firm Sentinel Capital Partners in 2014 for an undisclosed amount, identifying the chain's opportunity for growth as a driving factor in the decision to acquire the company. Sentinel, which specializes in buying and building companies, implemented a plan for rapid growth. Shortly after its acquisition by Sentinel, Newk's announced plans to grow to more than 300 units by 2018.

Today, over 100 Newk's locations operate in 13 U.S. states. The company is headquartered in Jackson, Mississippi. Newk's announced $141 million in revenue in 2014.

Fare
Newk's sells gourmet made-from-scratch sandwiches, soups, salads, California-style pizzas, desserts, fresh fruit, coffee, specialty drinks, wine, beer, and a large variety of related items. The restaurant chain, situated on the upscale spectrum of fast casual, maintains a strong culinary focus with all products made from scratch, with fresh ingredients in each store daily. Defining features of the company's restaurants are open kitchens and large round tables with complementary gourmet condiments, toppings, and breadstick crackers.

See also
 List of bakery cafés

References

External links
Official website
Newk's Eatery corporate history 

Coffeehouses and cafés in the United States
Companies based in Jackson, Mississippi
Private equity portfolio companies
Restaurant chains in the United States
Bakery cafés
Restaurants established in 2004
Fast casual restaurants
Restaurant franchises
2004 establishments in Mississippi
American companies established in 2004
Restaurants in Mississippi
Companies based in Mississippi